Antonio Domenicali (17 February 1936 – 5 July 2002) was an Italian racing cyclist and Olympic champion in track cycling.

He won a gold medal in team pursuit at the 1956 Summer Olympics in Melbourne (with Leandro Faggin, Franco Gandini and Valentino Gasparella).

References

External links
 
 
 
 
 

1936 births
2002 deaths
Italian male cyclists
Olympic gold medalists for Italy
Cyclists at the 1956 Summer Olympics
Olympic cyclists of Italy
Italian track cyclists
Sportspeople from the Province of Ferrara
Olympic medalists in cycling
Medalists at the 1956 Summer Olympics
Cyclists from Emilia-Romagna
20th-century Italian people